Helnes Lighthouse is a coastal lighthouse located on the northeastern coast of the island of Magerøya in Nordkapp Municipality in Troms og Finnmark county, Norway. The lighthouse was established in 1908, destroyed during World War II in 1944, rebuilt from 1946–1948, and automated in 2004. A radio beacon was established in 1955 and it emits a racon signal that is a Morse code letter N (– •).

The 1,371,000-candela light emits two white flashes every 30 seconds.

See also

Lighthouses in Norway
List of lighthouses in Norway

References

External links
 Norsk Fyrhistorisk Forening 

Lighthouses completed in 1908
Lighthouses in Troms og Finnmark
Nordkapp
1908 establishments in Norway